Sara Shamma (born 26 November 1975) is a UK-based Syrian artist whose paintings are figurative in style. The importance of storytelling and narrative is paramount in her work. Shamma has a long-standing interest in the psychology associated with the suffering of individuals and has made work on the subject of war, modern slavery and human trafficking. Her works can be divided into series that reflect prolonged periods of research.

Professional career
Shamma, was born in Damascus, Syria (1975) to a Syrian father and Lebanese mother. She graduated from the Painting Department of the Faculty of Fine Arts, University of Damascus in 1998. She moved to London in 2016 where she currently lives and works, under the auspices of an Exceptional Talent Visa. Shamma has taught at the Adham Ismail Fine Arts Institute in Damascus (1997–2000).

Shamma was selected as one of the prize winners for the 2004 BP Portrait Award. She was subsequently invited to participate in a number of solo and group exhibitions around the world, including Q at the Royal College of Art, 2013, the Royal Society of Portrait Painters' Annual Exhibition at the Mall Galleries in 2013, and NordArt in Büdelsdorf, Germany in 2012. In 2010 she was selected as the 'Celebrity Partner' artist to the United Nations' World Food Programme (WFP).

Selected solo exhibitions

 2019 – Sara Shamma: Modern Slavery, Bush House, The Strand, King's College London, London
 2017 – London, Art Sawa Gallery, Dubai, UAE
 2015 – World Civil War Portraits, The Old Truman Brewery, London
 2014 – Diaspora, Art Sawa Gallery, Dubai
 2013 – Q, Royal College of Art, London
 2011 – Birth, Art House, Damascus
 2009 – Love, 360 MALL, Kuwait
 2008 – Sara Shamma Finishing Touch, Knowledge Village, Dubai
 2008 – Sara 1978, Art House, Damascus
 2007 – Music, Cornish Club Event Gallery, Kuwait
 2004 – Sara Shamma, Kalemaat Art Gallery, Aleppo and Kuwait
 2002 – Sara Shamma, Nassir Choura Art Gallery, Damascus
 2001 – Sara Shamma, Shell Cultural Club, Damascus
 1999 – Sara Shamma, French Cultural Center, Damascus

Selected group exhibitions

 2019 – The Ruth Borchard Self-portrait Prize, Piano Nobile, King's Place, London
 2019 – Multi-colour, 9 Cork Street, London
 2018 – The Summer Exhibition, Royal Academy of Arts, London
 2018 – New collective show, Mark Hachem Gallery, Beirut, Lebanon
 2015 – Guest artist, 33rd Emirates Fine Arts Society Annual Exhibition, Sharjah Art Museum
 2013 – The Royal Society of Portrait Painters Annual Exhibition, The Mall Galleries, London
 2013 – Florence Biennale, Florence
 2012 – Nord Art 2012 organised by KiC – Kunst in der Carlshütte, Büdelsdorf
 2010 – Art Prize 2010, Kendall College of Art and Design, Grand Rapids, Michigan
 2010 – Nord Art 2010 organized by KiC – Kunst in der Carlshütte, Büdelsdorf
 2010 – Contemporary Art from the Middle East, Ayyam Gallery, Dubai
 2008/9 – Damas-Paris, Regards Croisés, The Arab World Institute, Paris and National Museum, Damascus
 2008 – UAE Through Arabian Eyes, International Financial Centre, Dubai
 2008 – Syrian Artists, Souq Wakef Art Center, Doha
 2008 – The Waterhouse Natural History Art Prize, South Australian Museum, Adelaide and the National Archives of Australia, Canberra
 2007 – Panorama of Syrian Arts, Catzen Arts Centre at The American University, Washington D.C.
 2006 – Syrian Artists, Syrian Cultural Centre, Paris
 2005-06 – International Painting Prize of the Castellon County Council, ESPAId, Castellon and the Municipal Arts Centre of Alcorcon, Madrid
 2005 – Women and Arts, International Vision, Expo Sharjah, Sharjah
 2004/5 BP Portrait Award, National Portrait Gallery, London; Royal Albert Memorial Museum, Exeter; Aberdeen Art Gallery, Aberdeen; Royal West of England Academy, Bristol; Aberystwyth Arts Centre, Aberystwyth
 2004 – Syrian Artists, National Library, Madrid
 2003 – Festival du Monde Arabe de Montreal, Montreal
 2002 – Syrian Artists, Gallery Amber, Leiden and Enschede, The Netherlands
 2002 – International Artists, Gallery M-Art, Vienna
 2002 – Mediterranean Biennial, Kheir El Din Palace, Tunis
 2001 – Two Syrian Artists, Coventry Museum, Coventry
 2001 – Sharjah Biennial, Sharjah
 2001 – Cairo Biennial, Cairo

Selected public collections
  British Council
 National Museum, Damascus
  Ministry of Culture, Damascus
  Spanish Cultural Center, Damascus

Awards and honours

 2019 – Artist-in-residence with the Institute of Psychiatry, Psychology & Neuroscience at King's College London
 2019 – Shortlisted Asian Women of Achievement Awards, London
 2019 – Shortlisted Ruth Borchard Self-portrait Prize, London
 2013 – 4th prize and Special Mention, Florence Biennale
 2010 – Shortlisted NordArt Prize, the Annual International Exhibition, Kunst in der Carlshütte, Büdelsdorf, Germany
 2010 – United Nations Food programmes Celebrity Partner
 2009 – Second Prize in Painting of the Art/Literary Competition, Sculptural Pursuit magazine, United States
 2008 – 1st prize Waterhouse Natural History Art Prize, South Australian Museum, Adelaide, Australia
 2006 – Fine Arts Syndicate Award, Damascus
 2006 – Member of the jury for the Annual Exhibition for Syrian Artists, Damascus
 2005 – Shortlisted for the International Painting Prize of the Castellon County Council, Castellon, Spain
 2004: Fourth Prize at the BP Portrait Award at the National Portrait Gallery, London, UK
 2002 – Represented Syria in the Mediterranean Biennial, Kheir El Din Palace, Tunis
 2001 – 1st prize (Golden Medal) in Latakia Biennial, Syria
 2000 – 2nd prize Spanish Cultural Center Art Competition, Damascus
 2000 – 2nd prize British Council Art Competition, Damascus
 1998 – 2nd prize Youth Exhibition, Damascus

Publications

 Sara Shamma 2000-05, Damascus, 2005
 Sara Shamma 2005-07, Damascus, 2007
 Sara Shamma Music, Kuwait, 2007
 Sara Shamma, Damascus, 2008
 Sara Shamma Love, Kuwait, 2009
 Sara Shamma 2009-10, Damascus, 2011
 Sara Shamma Q by Jessica Lack, Royal College of Art, London, 2013
 Diaspora Sara Shamma by Edward Lucie-Smith, Art Sawa Gallery, Dubai, 2014
 Sara Shamma by Edward Lucie-Smith and Sacha Craddock, London, 2014
 World Civil War Portraits: Sara Shamma by Sacha Craddock, Old Truman Brewery, London, 2015
 London Sara Shamma by Charlotte Mullins, Art Sawa Gallery, London, 2017
 London Sara Shamma by Charlotte Mullins, London, 2018
 Sara Shamma: Modern Slavery'' by Kathleen Soriano and Dr Sian Oram, King's College London, London, 2019

References

External links
 Sara Shamma official website
 King's College artist in residence
 BP Portrait Award, National Portrait Gallery, London
 Mark Hachem Gallery
 Ruth Borchard Collection
 The Jalanbo Collection  
 Sara Shamma's interview with Forward Magazine
 Sara Shamma WFP Celebrity Partner 
 Bait al Qasid with Zahi Wehbe, Al Mayadeen TV, Beirut, Lebanon, 10 February 2019
 Artist's works show agony of war in Syria, CNN, February 2016 
 Syrian artist, Sara Shamma, fled the war with her family to start a new life in Lebanon, Rome report TV, Rome, Italy, 28 August 2016 
 Exiled Syrian artist paints portraits of a brutal war, Zain Asher, CNN, 12 May 2015 
 Syrian artist exhibits 'World Civil War Portraits', Today programme, BBC radio 4, 13 May 2015 
 Conflict of interest, the Monocle Weekly, Monocle 24, 17 May 2015 
 The Syrian tragedy in Sara Shamma's paintings, Al Jazeera (Arabic), 17 May 2015
 Syrian painter ”war changed my art”, Outlook podcast, BBC, London, December, 2014 
 Episode at Al Aan TV, 2011

1975 births
Living people
Syrian women painters
People from Damascus
Syrian contemporary artists
20th-century Syrian painters
21st-century Syrian painters
20th-century women artists
21st-century women artists